Mikhail Sergeyevich Pulyaev (born 22 June 1987) is a Russian judoka.

Personal life
Pulyaev is married and graduated from the University of the Interior Ministry branch in Ryazan. He is a member of the Ryazan police force department.

Career
Pulyaev won bronze in 66 kg at the 2014 European Judo Championships. He was defeated by Japanese Olympic bronze medalist Masashi Ebinuma at the 2014 World Championships in Chelyabinsk and settled for the silver medal.

Pulyaev took bronze in 66 kg at the inaugural 2015 European Games in the finals held in Baku, Azerbaijan.

References

External links
 
 
 

Russian male judoka
People from Podolsk
1987 births
Living people
Judoka at the 2015 European Games
European Games medalists in judo
European Games bronze medalists for Russia
Judoka at the 2016 Summer Olympics
Olympic judoka of Russia
Russian sportspeople in doping cases
Sportspeople from Moscow Oblast
21st-century Russian people